The 1990–91 Notre Dame Fighting Irish men's basketball team represented the University of Notre Dame during the 1990-91 college basketball season. It was the final season with Digger Phelps as head coach of the Irish.

Roster

Schedule and results

References

Notre Dame Fighting Irish men's basketball seasons
Notre Dame
Notre Dame Fighting Irish
Notre Dame Fighting Irish